= Leonard Bredol =

German footballer

Personal information
- Date of birth: 1 August 2000 (age 26)
- Place of birth: Germany
- Height: 1.82 m (6 ft 0 in)
- Position: Defender

Team information
- Current team: Blau-Weiß Lohne

Youth career
- 2007–2019: SV Meppen

Senior career*
Years	Team	Apps	(Gls)
2019–2021	SV Meppen	5	(0)
2021–	Blau-Weiß Lohne		
- * Club domestic league appearances and goals as of 11 October 2021

Leonard Bredol (born 1 August 2000) is a German professional footballer who plays for Blau-Weiß Lohne.
